Japanese heavy metal band X Japan has performed more than 250 concerts from 1987 until October 2018. This number does not include the so-called "film gig" concerts, which are included below.

Concerts and other performances

 film gig: projection of a recorded concert in a real concert hall

References 

 
 
 
 
 

Lists of concert tours